The Maldives Police Service is the civilian national police force of the Republic of Maldives. It is responsible for enforcing criminal and traffic law, enhancing public safety, maintaining order and keeping the peace throughout Maldives. The organization comes under the control of the Ministry of Home Affairs.

History 

A Police force was established by Law on 29 March 1933, during the kingdom of A-Sultan Muhammad Shamsuddeen III. The service consisted initially of 120 officers, organised into duty shifts. Officers were issued with uniforms of Maldivian Traditional Dress of Mundu and Libaas plus black cap, belt and straps on duty. They were equipped with batons and issued whistles for communication. Their duty was to patrol the market area and the island. In other words, establishing peace amongst the citizens and protecting the people and their belongings. The law that established police on 29 March 1933 by Sultan Mohamed Shamsudhdheen, has never been cancelled by any of the historical writings seen so far. It is known that Police and Military were separate organizations when they first formed.

The Police worked with the assistance of the Military when needed, the protection and help of military was available as the Law stated . During the earlier days of Police, there was violence between the foreign investors and the Maldivians. The foreigners stopped business with Maldivians and closed their shops which caused the Maldivians to suffer. The Police tried their best to control the situation, but needed the help of the Military. The Military helped the Police in their full strength and finally brought the situation under control. That was on 15 May 1933.

The initial Investigation office was small with only three investigation tables . The three tables in the investigating office represented three sections of the service; Theft, Political and Serious Crimes. The office was mostly painted in green which is why the place was also called the Green Office. In 1970 Police office was changed to the building that has since become the Bandara Koshi library. New sections formed; Traffic Control and road accidents were being monitored by the police. The police force was soon disbanded although the initial law was not revoked. The police force was formally re-established on 13 March 1972, as a branch of the security force, which were then known as National Guards, functioning under the Ministry of Public Safety.

The operating procedures of service established in 1933 were maintained until the election of Maumoon Abdul Gayoom on 11 November 1978. When the force was re-structured under Ministry of Defense and National Security on 10 January 1979, National Guards were renamed as National Security Service. Since the organization was expanding, the lack of space in the building was experienced. As a result, finally, in 1985 the headquarters was re-located to the building of the current Ministry of Defense and National Security. Apart from an Admin Section, five investigation sections were formed.

And in 1992 a Police Inspector from the West Yorkshire Police named David Price introduced the modern working structure of the Police, introducing Police beats and mobile patrols. Police shifted to Shaheedh Hussain Adam Building in 1999 and on 1 September 2004 Maldives Police Service was formed under the Ministry of Home Affairs which was a major functional shift of the present administration. National Security Service was later renamed as Maldives National Defence Force.

On 1 July 2013 police reserve force known as the Special Constabulary was inaugurated. And on 23 July 2013 first official ceremony to commemorate the Police Memorial Day was held. The Police Memorial Day is an annual nationwide event which aims to remember, honour and pay respects to each and every Police Officer who lost their lives in the line of duty. And on the same day Police Memorial Wall was inaugurated to honour the members of the Maldives Police Service who lost their lives in the line of duty.

Organization structure

Commissioners Bureau 
 Executive Support Services
 International Relations Department
 Police Media Center
 Grievance Officer

Organisational Reform and Development 
 Strategic Planning Department
 Legal Department

Professional Standards Command 
 Administration Unit
 Internal Investigation Unit
 Quality Assessment and Awareness unit

Directorate of Intelligence

Crime Investigation Command 
 Drug Enforcement Department
 Economic Crime Department
 Family & Child Protection Department
 Major Crime Management Center
 General Investigation Department
 Anti-Human Trafficking Unit
 Victim Support Unit

Internal Security Command 
 Male’ City Police
 Traffic Management Department
 Industrial Security Department
 Special Operations Department
 Police Communication Center
 Major Events
 HULHUMALE POLICE

Divisional Operations Command 
 NORTHERN OPERATIONS 
 Upper North Police Division
 North Police Division
 North Central Police Division
 SOUTHERN OPERATIONS
 Central Police Division
 South Central Police Division
 Upper South Police Division
 South Police Division

Specialist Support 
 Forensic Services
 Information & Communication Technology Services
 Police Custodial Department
 Marine Police Department

Staff Welfare and Finance Management 
 Finance and Asset Management
 Electrical and Mechanical Engineering Services
 Public Affairs Department
 Human Resource Development

Support Services 
 Logistic Services
 Police Medical Services
 Uniform & Accessories Department
 Police Club
 Police Family Association

Training and Development 
 National College of Policing and Law Enforcement

Rank structure

Medals and ribbons

Medals 
National Level Medals
 Medal of Honor
 Presidential Medal
 Medal for Exceptional Bravery
 Medal for Bravery
 3 November Medal
 Purple Heart
 Long Service Medal
 Independence 50 Medal
 Republic 50 Medal
 Tsunami Medal
Service Level Medals
 Distinguished Service Medal
 Police Service Medal
 Gold Life Saving Medal
 Silver Life Saving Medal
 Dedicated Service Medal
 Good Conduct Medal
 Police Medal

Ribbons 
National Level Ribbons
 Presidential Ribbon
Service Level Ribbons
 Long Service Ribbon
 Ribbon of Bravery
 Dedicated Service Ribbon
 Police Service Ribbon
 Good Conduct Ribbon
 Special Duty Ribbon
 Achievement Gold Ribbon
 Achievement Silver Ribbon
 Ribbon of Skill
 Ribbon of Drill

References

External links

Further reading 

 .
 .
 .

 .
 .

Law enforcement in the Maldives
Government agencies established in 2004
2004 establishments in the Maldives